Max Alexander may refer to:

Max Alexander (comedian) (1953–2016), U.S. comedian and actor
Max Alexander (boxer) (born 1981), U.S. boxer
Max Alexander (journalist) (born 1957), U.S. journalist
Max Alexander (producer), film producer who partnered with his brother Arthur Alexander (producer)